Magnus Norman was the defending champion, but the fifth seeded Swede lost in the first round to qualifier Adrian Voinea. Younes El Aynaoui won in the final 6–0, 6–3 against number three seed Mariano Zabaleta and captured the second title of his professional career.

Seeds
Champion seeds are indicated in bold while text in italics indicates the round in which that seed was eliminated.

Draw

Finals

Section 1

Section 2

External links
 ATP main draw

Singles